Dysphania ambrosioides, formerly Chenopodium ambrosioides, known as Jesuit's tea, Mexican-tea, payqu (paico), epazote, mastruz,  or herba sanctæ Mariæ, is an annual or short-lived perennial herb native to Central America, South America, and southern Mexico.

Growth
The flowers are small and green, produced in a branched panicle at the apex of the stem.

As well as in its native areas, it is grown in warm temperate to subtropical areas of Europe and the United States (Missouri, New England, Eastern United States), sometimes becoming an invasive weed.

Taxonomy
The species was described in 1753 by Carl Linnaeus as Chenopodium ambrosioides. Some researchers treated it as a highly polymorphic species with several subspecies. Today these are considered as their own species within genus Dysphania (e.g. American wormseed, Chenopodium ambrosioides var. anthelminticum is now accepted as Dysphania anthelmintica).

The generic name Dysphania was traditionally applied in the 1930s to some species endemic to Australia. Placement and rank of this taxon have ranged from a mere section within Chenopodium to the sole genus of a separate family, Dysphaniaceae, or a representative of the Illicebraceae. The close affinity of Dysphania to "glandular" species of Chenopodium sensu lato is now evident.

The specific epithet ambrosioides refers to the plant's resemblance to unrelated plants of the genus Ambrosia, in the aster family.

Etymology
The common Spanish name epazote (sometimes spelled and pronounced ipasote or ypasote) is derived from the Nahuatl word epazōtl.

Usage

Culinary uses
Ideally collected before going to seed, D. ambrosioides is used as a leaf vegetable, herb, and herbal tea for its pungent flavor. Raw, it has a resinous, medicinal pungency, similar to oregano, anise, fennel, or even tarragon, but stronger. The fragrance of D. ambrosioides is strong and unique. A common analogy is to turpentine or creosote. It has also been compared to citrus, savory, and mint.

Although it is traditionally used with black beans for flavor and its antiflatulent properties, it is also sometimes used to flavor other traditional Mexican dishes: it can be used to season quesadillas and sopes (especially those containing huitlacoche), soups, mole de olla, tamales with cheese and chili peppers, chilaquiles, eggs and potatoes, and enchiladas. It is often used as an herb in fried white rice, and it is an important ingredient for making the green salsa for chilaquiles.

Toxicity
Humans have died from overdoses of D. ambrosioides essential oils (attributed to the ascaridole content). Symptoms include severe gastroenteritis with pain, vomiting, and diarrhea.

Agricultural use
The essential oils of D. ambrosioides contain terpene compounds, some of which have natural pesticide capabilities. The compound ascaridole in epazote inhibits the growth of nearby species, so it is best to grow it at a distance from other plants.

Companion plant
Dysphania ambrosioides not only contains terpene compounds, but it also delivers partial protection to nearby plants simply by masking their scent to some insects, making it a useful companion plant. Its small flowers may also attract some predatory wasps and flies.

Chemical constituents
 
Epazote contains oil of chenopodium, which Merriam-Webster defines as “a colorless or pale yellow toxic essential oil of unpleasant odor and taste, … formerly used as an anthelmintic”.

Epazote essential oil contains ascaridole (up to 70%), limonene, p-cymene, and smaller amounts of numerous other monoterpenes and monoterpene derivatives (α-pinene, myrcene, terpinene, thymol, camphor and trans-isocarveol). Ascaridole (1,4-peroxido-p-menth-2-ene) is rather an uncommon constituent of spices; another plant owing much of its character to this monoterpene peroxide is boldo. Ascaridole is slightly toxic and has a pungent, not very pleasant flavor. In pure form, ascaridole decomposes violently upon heating, but this is relatively weak in regards to energy release, since breaking the oxygen bond will not destroy the entire molecule. Ascaridole content is lower in epazote from Mexico than in epazote grown in Europe or Asia.

References

External links

 Gernot Katzer's Spice Pages
 Treating Livestock with Medicinal Plants: Beneficial or Toxic? Chenopodium ambrosioides
 Tropical Plant database: Chenopodium ambrosioides
 Dysphania ambrosioides in Flora of North America

ambrosioides
Antiflatulents
Flora of Michigan
Flora of New Jersey
Herbs
Leaf vegetables
Medicinal plants of Central America
Medicinal plants of North America
Medicinal plants of South America
Mesoamerican cuisine
Plants described in 1753
Taxa named by Carl Linnaeus
Flora without expected TNC conservation status